Lukavac is a town and municipality in Tuzla Canton, Bosnia and Herzegovina.

Lukavac may also refer to:

Bosnia and Herzegovina
 Lukavac (Brčko), a village
 Lukavac (Trnovo), a village

Croatia
 Lukavac, Croatia, a village near Slatina, Croatia

Serbia
 Lukavac (Kruševac), a village
 Lukavac (Valjevo), a village